Örnsberg metro station is a station on the red line of the Stockholm metro, located in Aspudden in the south part of Stockholm Municipality. The station was opened on 5 April 1964 as the southwest terminus of the first stretch of the Red line, from T-Centralen to Örnsberg, with a branch to Fruängen. On 16 May 1965, the line was extended further southwest to Sätra.

References

Red line (Stockholm metro) stations
Railway stations opened in 1964